Frank William Whitcombe (29 May 1913 – 17 January 1958), also known by the nickname of "The Big Man", was a Welsh rugby union, and professional rugby league footballer who played in the 1930s and 1940s.

Early life
Whitcombe was one of ten children growing up at 52 Wedmore Road in Grangetown. His Father Frederick William Whitcombe worked as a Blacksmith's striker at the Dry docks His sport was as a prize fighter, Bare-knuckle boxing, at Cardiff Docks known locally as Tiger Bay.

Times would be hard for Gertrude Whitcombe, Frank's mother, but she was a resourceful woman, for income the family firstly had her brother and Samuel & Emily Leonard as lodgers. Mrs Whitcombe would send one of the children to the brewery for a jug of yeast, and would brew her own beer, the children would sell this to the neighbours, and she would also make Sloe gin to sell in the Autumn

Along with brother George Whitcombe, Frank attended Ninian Park Council School in Cardiff. On leaving school at 14 he worked for McNeil's The Coal and later as a van boy with the Great Western Railway.

Rugby union career

Army Rugby Union
Then after a period of unemployment on 17 January 1931 Whitcombe enlisted as a Sapper number 1869154 in 38th Field Company, Royal Engineers as a Motor Driver.

This was an outstanding sporting unit, in his first year of service, 38th Field Company won the Athletic Challenge Cup, the Boxing cup and the Rugby cup. This was the start of Whitcombe's rugby union playing career with the Army. He had a sparkling career playing twenty seven times for the Army team and won two caps. on 23 February 1935 Whitcombe played on the winning Army team v Territorial Army at Taunton R.F.C. by 18 – 5. A game used as a trial match for the upcoming inter services. He then won his first cap on the winning Army Rugby Union team against the Royal Navy 11–8, on 2 March, in a famous victory with the Army team having only 13 players, due to injury for most of the match. His fellow prop was the England Captain Douglas Kendrew who was one of the players who had to leave the field injured after only 15 minutes.

Then on the losing side 3–6 to the Royal Air Force on 23 March at Twickenham in a game dominated by the RAF standoff Gus Walker, making the Inter-Services title of 1935 a Triple Tie. While serving in the Army, Whitcombe reached the rank of lance corporal, very few non-commissioned officers made the Army side at this time.

Prior to turning professional, Whitcombe played at Twickenham in the final of the Middlesex Sevens on Saturday 27 April 1935 for London Welsh losing 3–10 to Harlequin's. The following week Whitcombe returned to Cardiff to play in the Welsh final trial

On 25 July 1933, in Cardiff, Whitcombe married Doris May (née Bryan) who lived at 15 Sussex Street also in Grangetown. Whitcombe's father-in-law, Alfie Bryan, was an amateur boxing trainer who worked in the gym with Jim Driscoll. Whitcombe had a brief boxing career while in the army. He won his first eleven bouts, but when he lost his twelfth he decided eleven good wins were not worth one good hiding.

King George V Silver Jubilee Trust

While playing rugby union for London Welsh RFC Whitcombe was selected to play for The Rest V Wales on 4 May 1935 in a special rugby union match arranged to benefit the King George V Silver Jubilee Trust at Cardiff Arms Park.

From a Welsh point of view this game served as a guide to discovering fresh talent for the next season. The game particularly showed that there were some very good young forwards in Wales, including Whitcombe.

Some of the players who took part in this game went on to be rugby league greats. On the Wales side that day playing at Stand off was a teenager from Swansea still attending Gowerton county school, one W T H "Willie" Davies a future Lance Todd trophy winner and teammate of Whitcombe's at Bradford Northern and Great Britain. Playing on the wing for Wales was Arthur Bassett of Aberavon, who would also become Whitcombe's teammate for Great Britain. Bassett famously scored a hat-trick of tries in Great Britain's Ashe's clinching victory over Australia at Brisbane in 1946. In the rest side with Whitcombe on the wing was Alan Edwards of Aberavon, also a future Bradford Northern and Wales teammate. Edwards has the distinction of being one of only five players in the history of the game to win all six major rugby league cups in his career.

A quirk of fate here is Arthur Childs also played in the rest team with Whitcombe, a back row forward from Abertillery who also turned professional with the Halifax club. Twenty nine years later Arthur's son, Rodney Childs, and Whitcombe's son, Frank Whitcombe Jr, were the two prop forwards for the North Eastern Counties side against Sir Wilson Whineray's 5th New Zealand All Blacks team on their tour of Britain in 1964

Wales defeated the Rest 13–5. A special jersey was made for this game and given to the players afterwards. All the proceeds from this match where donated to the Kings Silver Jubilee Trust Fund

Rugby league career
Despite the efforts of his brother George to persuade him otherwise, an earlier offer, in March 1935 from the Wigan Rugby League Club was turned down by Whitcombe. When a second offer came on 18 September 1935 from the Broughton Rangers rugby league club, Whitcombe accepted. He was paid £100 for his services along with two new suits. Of his signing fee, £90 was to buy him out of the Army, leaving him £10 to start a new life at 5 Cawdor Road, Fallowfield, a suburb of Manchester, with his young family. Whitcombe shared his house with former Llanelli RFC, and Wales rugby union player, Bryn Howells, who like Whitcombe had made the decision to 'Go north' and seek a better life for their families. He was now the Broughton Rangers , Howells was also a professional Lancashire League cricketer.

Whitcombe's new club provided him with a job as a zookeeper at Belle Vue Zoological Gardens where Rangers played at the Belle Vue Stadium inside the Motorcycle Speedway track. At this time Belle Vue was the leisure centre for the North West of England.

Whitcombe made his début against Swinton at home on 19 October 1935 and played his last game for Broughton Rangers against St. Helens away on 17 December 1938. During his career at Rangers he played in a memorable victory on Christmas Day, 25 December 1937, when Broughton Rangers defeated Wally Prigg's touring Australian rugby league team 13–0 on their 1937/38 Kangaroo Tour of Great Britain. Soon after this Whitcombe was signed by Bradford Northern for a record fee and the family crossed the Pennines, and settled in Wibsey.

Extract from Bradford Northern 1948 Challenge Cup Final brochure:

Genial giant Frank is the wit as well as the heavy-weight of the team. He turns the scales at over 18st. And opposing forwards really know they have been in a game after 80 minutes with him. But as a boy in Cardiff, where he was born in 1913, Frank was a full back. He turned to the pack after joining the Army. He played 27 times for the Army team and won a Welsh international trial.

In 1935 Broughton Rangers signed him and he gained his first Welsh Rugby league International cap the following season. He has been Wales' first choice as  ever since, he played in Australia with Gus Risman's team and played in the first two tests. Bradford Northern made one of their best moves ever when they signed him from Broughton Rangers. He takes a well earned benefit this season.

Following Whitcombe's world record transfer fee of £850 to Bradford Northern in 1938 – Rugby League secretary John Wilson added "He is the best in the game", (based on increases in average earnings, this would be approximately £141,700 in 2016).

Welsh international honours

After turning professional, Whitcombe went on to win his first cap for Wales while at the Broughton Rangers, and further caps following his move to Bradford Northern. Between 1938 and 1948 Whitcombe won fourteen caps.

His first cap for Wales was in their 17–9 victory over England on 10 November 1938 at Stebonheath Park, Llanelli's football ground. The Welsh team was captained by the record points scorer Jim Sullivan. Whitcombe's second cap against France away in Bordeaux in front of a crowd of 25,000 on 16 April 1939 resulting in a 16–10 defeat for Wales. Wales finished runners-up in the 1938–39 European Champions. His last game was against Australia on 20 November 1948 at St. Helens Swansea; Australia won 12–5.

International Games for Wales 1938 to 1948

1938 Saturday 5 November Wales 17 V England 9     – Stebonheath Park (Llanelli) – Crowd 15,000
1939 Sunday 16 April Wales 10 V France 16        – Stade Chaban-Delmas (Bordeaux) – Crowd 25,000
1939 Saturday 23 December Wales 16 V England 3     – Odsal Stadium (Bradford) – Crowd 15,257
1940 Saturday 9 November Wales 5 V England 8      – The Watersheddings (Oldham) – Crowd 5,000
1941 Saturday 18 October Wales 9 V England 9       – Odsal Stadium (Bradford) – Crowd 4,339
1943 Saturday 27 February Wales 9 V England 15     – Central Park (Wigan) – Crowd 17,000
1944 Saturday 26 February Wales 9 V England 9      – Central Park (Wigan) – Crowd 16,028
1945 Saturday 24 November Wales 11 V England 3     – St Helen's (Swansea) – Crowd 30,000
1946 Sunday 24 March Wales 7 V France 19         – Stade Chaban-Delmas (Bordeaux) – Crowd 18,000
1946 Saturday 12 October Wales 13 V England 10     – Station Road (Swinton) – Crowd 20,213
1946 Saturday 16 November Wales 5 V England 19     – St Helen's (Swansea) – Crowd 25,000
1947 Saturday 18 January Wales 5 V France 14       – Stade Vélodrome (Marseille) – Crowd 24,500
1948 Saturday 20 March Wales 12 V France 20        – St Helen's (Swansea) – Crowd 12,032
1948 Saturday 20 November Wales 5 V Australia 12   – St Helen's (Swansea) – Crowd 9,224

Great Britain international career

Whitcombe was selected for the Great Britain tour to Australia in 1940 which was cancelled due to the outbreak of the Second World War. However he won two caps for Great Britain while at Bradford Northern in 1946 against Australia on the famous "Indomitables" tour.

On tour Whitcombe did not start the first game against Southern Districts, but then played nine successive matches including the Queensland game in Brisbane, and the two games against New South Wales in Sydney. He scored the second Great Britain try in the 8–8 drawn first test at the Sydney Cricket Ground on 17 June in front of a crowd of 64,527. This game was dubbed the 'Commando Test' due to the brutal exchanges in the first test. Shortly before Great Britain centre Jack Kitching was sent off, Whitcombe 'King Hit' his opposite Aussie  Frank 'Bumper' Farrell. When the unfortunate St. John Ambulance man ran on to administer the Australian forward with smelling salts to bring him round a still groggy Farrell lashed out at him mistaking him for Whitcombe.

He then played in the winning side against Australia 14–5 in the second Test at the Brisbane Exhibition Ground on 6 July 1946 the crowd was 65,000. Great Britain won the 1946 Rugby League Ashes series. Following this game Whitcombe was referred to as "The Steam Roller" by the Melbourne newspaper 'The Truth'.

Despite the damage the Australian and Great Britain forwards had inflicted on each other only hours before after the third Test, Ken Gee, Joe Egan, Whitcombe, Ike Owens, Arthur Clues, 'Bumper' Farrell and Noel Mulligan drank heartily together at The Dolphin Hotel in Surry Hills until the early hours of next morning.

Fellow tourist Trevor Foster said of Whitcombe. "He was an outstanding player on the 1946 Indomitables tour, scoring tries and was the best forward in the scrum. He took on the Aussie pack on his own and was genuinely feared by the Australians. It took sometimes three and often four men to get him down in the tackle. He was strong and fearless".

Whitcombe's performances on tour attracted the attention of the Sydney based club, St. George. Club official Jack Moggridge offered Whitcombe a two-year contract at £600 per season as player-coach plus costs of transport and a lucrative job, (based on increases in average earnings, this would be approximately £59,340 in 2016). Whitcombe signed the two-year contract with St George, however on his return to Bradford the family decided to stay in Yorkshire.

On 21 July the touring party left Australia for the New Zealand leg of the tour over a nine-day period Whitcombe played for Great Britain on 29 July 1946 against West Coast losing 8–17 then five days later on 3 August he played against Auckland winning 9–7 and again three days later on 6 August against South Auckland winning 42–12 and scoring a try. He played against Auckland again on 12 August winning 22–9 his last game for Great Britain. Whitcombe played 19 games on the 1946 tour of Australia and New Zealand more than any other player.

The Great Britain team left New Zealand aboard the RMS Rangitikei on 14 August arriving in Tilbury on 22 September at 10pm, four days late. When the party returned home after the five-month tour they had travelled more than 25,000 nautical miles around the world

Great Britain formed a team that relaunched rugby league in a world devastated by World War II.
Many regard them as the most famous touring team of all time and who remain the only Great Britain team to be unbeaten in a test series in Australia.
The tour was historic as it was the first major event in any sport after the war ended.
The Australian government made a personal plea to the British parliament to enable the tour to go ahead, as it wanted to lift the morale of its people, struggling to come to terms with the tragedy of the war.
At that time Royal Navy vessels were the only way to travel, but the team managed to secure berths and made the trip aboard the aircraft carrier, the touring party stoked the boilers to keep fit on board , from where the nickname came. The journey took almost six weeks to make the journey. The ship was instructed to leave the Great Britain party in Perth and then divert to Singapore to collect injured prisoners who had been incarcerated in Changi jail during the Japanese occupation.
The tourists were then forced to complete the arduous journey to Sydney by train, which took five days. There was no sleeping accommodation on board and the train stopped for refreshments at army camps en route with players drawing lots for the right to sleep on the wire-netting luggage racks

Rugby league Challenge Cup Final appearances
Whitcombe played in 5 Rugby League Challenge Cup Cup finals;

Bradford Northern's 8-3 aggregate victory over Wigan in the 1943–44 Challenge Cup Final, the 0–3 defeat at Central Park, Wigan on Saturday 15 April 1944, and the 8–0 victory at Odsal Stadium, Bradford, on Saturday 22 April 1944. Whitcombe scoring the decisive try in the game
Bradford Northern's 9-13 aggregate defeat by Huddersfield in the 1944–45 Challenge Cup Final, the 4–7 defeat at Fartown Ground, Huddersfield, on 28 April 1945, and the 5–6 defeat at Odsal Stadium on 5 May 1945 three days before the Second World War ended.

Whitcombe played , in three consecutive Wembley Challenge Cup Finals of 1946, 1947, and 1948. The first time any rugby league or Football club had appeared in three consecutive Wembley finals.

Bradford Northern's 8–4 victory over Leeds in the 1946–47 Challenge Cup Final at Wembley Stadium, London on 3 May 1947, won the Lance Todd Trophy,
Bradford Northern's 3–8 defeat by Wigan in the 1947–48 Challenge Cup Final at Wembley Stadium, London on 3 May 1947 and won the Lance Todd Trophy, on 1 May 1948, becoming the first player to be awarded The Lance Todd Trophy while on the losing team, as well as the first forward and the oldest player. This was the first rugby league final attended by a reigning monarch, King George VI.
Bradford Northern's 12–0 victory over Halifax in the 1948–49 Challenge Cup Final at Wembley Stadium, London on 7 May the first Challenge Cup final to be "sold out" the crowd was 95,050 spectators.

Wembley Stadium 1947. Teammate Trevor Foster remembered "On our bus journey to the stadium we were caught up in a traffic jam and running late. The driver was in a state of panic, it could have been something to do with him not being sure of the route through London. Much to our amusement the great character, Frank Whitcombe, took over the driver's seat and proceeded to bypass all traffic in front and put his foot on the pedals. We sailed through the centre of the big city. Past the Palace of Westminster with motorists bellowing and waving fists at our bus. Frank, with a huge smile sailed away to get us to Wembley bang on time".

A personal record came in the 1948–49 Challenge Cup Final when, just 29 days short of his 35th birthday, he became the oldest as well as the heaviest player to play in a Challenge Cup final.

Bradford Northern played in five of the six Challenge Cup finals between 1944 and 1949, the first two finals; the 1943–44 Challenge Cup Final against Wigan, and the 1944–45 Challenge Cup Final against Huddersfield were played over two-legs, five Bradford Northern players played in all five of these finals, they were; Eric Batten, Vic Darlison, Donald Ward, Ernest Ward, and Frank Whitcombe.

On Saturday 30 April 1949 Bradford Northern played Whitehaven. Harry Hornby Managing Director of Bradford Northern had a bronze medal struck by Edouard Fraisse of Paris to commemorate Whitcombe's achievement of winning the Lance Todd trophy the previous year and for his services to Rugby League. This was presented to him after the match

Rugby Football League championship

Frank Whitcombe played in 5 Championship play-off finals;

1939–40 Championship play-off final played both legs, against Swinton away won 21–13 home won 16–9. Whitcombe scoring a try in each game
1940–41 Championship play-off final against Wigan played in both legs away won 17–6 home won 28–9 away.
1941–42 Championship play-off final against Dewsbury losing 0-13. 
1944–45 Championship play-off final against Halifax Won losing 9–2 away before winning 24–11 at home.
1947–48 Championship Final was lost to Warrington 5–15 at Maine Road, Manchester.

County Cup Final appearances
Whitcombe played in 4 Yorkshire County Cup Finals;

1940–41: Bradford Northern win the 1940–41 Yorkshire County Cup Final won 15–5 against Dewsbury at Fartown Ground, Huddersfield, on Saturday 5 April 1941
1941–42: Bradford Northern win the 1941–42 Yorkshire County Cup Final won 24–0 against Halifax at Fartown Ground, Huddersfield, on Saturday 6 December 1941
1945–46: Bradford Northern win the 1945–46 Yorkshire County Cup final won 5–2 against Wakefield Trinity try being scored by Whitcombe, at Thrum Hall, Halifax on Saturday 3 November 1945
1948–49: Bradford Northern win the 1948–49 Yorkshire County Cup Final won 18–9 against Castleford at Headingley Rugby Stadium, Leeds on Saturday 30 October 1948

Yorkshire League
Yorkshire County League winners during the 1939–40 season
Yorkshire County League winners during the 1940–41 season
Yorkshire County League winners during the 1947–48 season

Testimonial match
Whitcombe's Testimonial match for Bradford Northern was on Saturday 10 April 1948 at Odsal Stadium, Bradford, against Wakefield Trinity

Honoured at Bradford Northern

Whitcombe made his début on Boxing Day 1938 in a 25–7 victory over Bramley at Odsal Stadium. He scored his first try for Bradford Northern against Wakefield Trinity in a 22–0 home win on 2 January 1939.
Whitcombe's only goal for the club was in a Yorkshire League game against Hull F.C. on 2 June 1941 when Whitcombe kicked the only conversion in the Bradford northern score in their 29–5 win.
His last game for Bradford Northern was the last match of the 1948–49 season against Dewsbury, fittingly at Odsal in a 10–9 win. Prior to this game Whitcombe shook hands with Ernest Ward on the field so the 19,000 Bradford Northern supporters could say farewell.

The Bradford Northern captain described Whitcombe as a great player.

During his career at Bradford Northern Whitcombe played in eighteen major finals and league wins, including five Rugby League Challenge Cup finals, five Rugby League Championship play-off finals, won four Yorkshire cups, and won three Yorkshire league titles.

In total he made 331 league and cup appearances. On Wednesday 10 November 1948 he played on the losing Bradford Northern side 7 – 21 to Col Maxwell's Australian 1948/49 Kangaroo Touring Team. At the end of the season he flew from Ringway Airport to France on Northern's first ever overseas tour on this end of season 'treat' for everybody connected with the club, after the disappointment of losing both Challenge Cup and Championship finals.

Bradford Northern played Toulouse Olympique winning 21–17 on 15 May 1948. The following day they beat AS Carcassonne 16–10 The second game was also the first time the Bradford club had played on a Sunday.

Whitcombe was included in Bradford Bulls Millennium Masters.

Harry Hornby, the Chairman, and financial power behind Bradford Northern in those days paid a world record fee for Whitcombe. Whitcombe was a hard player during an era when the game was at its toughest. His rivalry with the great Australian and New South Wales  i.e. number 11 or 12, Arthur Clues who played for Leeds was legendary. Clues was the first Australian to join an English club after World War II. Their confrontations on the field during the Bradford Northern v Leeds local derby games are part of rugby league folklore.

Trevor Foster recalled an incident after Bradford Northern's 8–4 victory over Leeds in the 1946–47 Challenge Cup Final, ironically against Leeds in a fierce fought 11–9 Yorkshire cup tie win. Clues kicked out violently at Bradford Northern  Gwylfa Jones at a scrum missing his head by inches. Immediately Whitcombe stood up from the scrum and confronted his reckless action. He ran towards Arthur with both fists clenched Whitcombe drove the full force of his 18 stone frame in to Arthur Clues chest and pole-axed him. Clues could not get his breath and for ten minutes received emergency medical attention in front of the 17,000 Odsal crowd. Before the referee could send Whitcombe off, Whitcombe was all ready walking towards the changing rooms knowing what was coming. Arthur Clues was carried off on a stretcher and also sent off. In time honoured tradition the two men shook hands after the game to show their mutual respect for each other. Clues later confessed that no one had ever hit him so hard. Whitcombe received a 9-week ban for his actions

Whitcombe and Clues became great friends when their playing days were over. They used to spend a lot of time in Whitcombe's public house The Kings Head in Bradford. Whitcombe took on the role of self-appointed 'minder' for Bradford Northern's slightly built, mercurial Welsh stand-off Willie Davies when he was targeted by opposing teams.

Honoured by the City of Cardiff - European Capital of Sport 2014

The city of Cardiff celebrated the sporting achievements of 3 'local sporting heroes' as part of the city's celebrations as European Capital of Sport 2014. Frank Whitcombe along with his brother George were two of them, along with boxer Jack Petersen. A special event was held in their home town of Grangetown, in the local library, on 8 April 2014. Here their sporting achievements were recognized, which included the Challenge Cup being brought back to Ninian Park School and to 52 Wedmore road where Frank was born and grew up as a boy. Key note speakers included, Rugby journalist Peter Jackson, Wales Rugby League team manager Mike Nicholas, and Simon Foster, son of Frank's teammate Trevor Foster. Simon presented a talk on the 'Indominatables' tour to Australia. A poem composed by the Foster family as a tribute to Whitcombe was read out.

Frank Whitcombe – Super prop

Who us this man called Whitcombe,
This man all forwards fear,
A prop who's always dangerous,
Whenever he gets near (the try line)

The sturdily built Welshman, since moving up t'north,
Has proved to be a man of power,
A titan moving forth.

Every team opposing him, are put into the 'blue',
None of them, who played back then could big Frank not subdue.

We know just how to deal with him; they all said that at first,
But he's difficult to stop, when once he's on the burst.

Opposing forwards made their vows, that he'll not score again,
But somehow it's beyond their powers, their efforts all in vain.

Most of his team just wait for him, he is afraid of none,
It's nothing new to see him cross, with three (Nay 4) men hanging on.

If they decide to tackle him, by going for his knees,
Just when they think they've got Frank taped, he'll hand them off with ease.

But these are not the only ways in which he rose to fame,
In scrummaging his mighty shove, was how he played the game.

Who is this giant called Whitcombe, spectators well might ask,
Those men, who tried to tackle him, endured no easy task!

Wartime service

During the Second World War Whitcombe worked as a long-distance lorry driver for Harold Wood Ltd Bulk Liquid Transporters of Heckmondwike, a reserved occupation. Harold Wood had government contracts to deliver aviation fuel in the early part of the war to RAF airfields, and later oil to Royal Navy mother ship's off the coast of Rhyl for the re supply of submarines. He also delivered Toluene for explosives. This job involved driving all over the country, he often drove through the black out, and on several occasions when delivering aviation fuel took refuge under his wagon during air raids.

Many men in reserved occupations joined civil defence units. Under the command of Lieutenant "Two pips" Teddy Lightfoot, Whitcombe served as a sergeant major in the Wibsey branch of the Home Guard, meeting at the Park Hotel, Reevy Road, Wibsey

Genealogical information
Frank Whitcombe was the brother of the association footballer for Cardiff City and Wales baseball captain; George Whitcombe, and the baseball player for Grange Albion; Teddy Whitcombe, and he was the cousin of the rugby union footballer; Frank Trott. He was the father of the rugby union footballer for Bradford RFC; Brian Whitcombe, and the rugby union prop for North Eastern Counties, Yorkshire, Bradford RFC; Frank Whitcombe Jr, the grandfather of the rugby union prop for England 'B' and Leicester Tigers; Martin Whitcombe, and the great-grandfather rugby union prop for England (Under-20s) and Leicester Tigers (2019/20 Development Squad); James William Whitcombe (born 20 November 2000).

Outside of rugby league
When Whitcombe first arrived in Bradford from Fallowfield, he drove an Omnibus for The Blythe & Berwick Bus Company and later a wagon for Ryburn United Transport Ltd, off Wakefield Road, also in Bradford.

With his wife Doris they were the landlord, and landlady of two public houses in Bradford. Firstly in 1947 Whitcombe took on The Hallfield Hotel a Melbourne Breweries 'Ale House' on Trafalgar Road opposite Busby's Department Store on Manningham Lane. He then took The Kings Head, a Heys Brewery Public House on Westgate in the city centre. This was from 8 December 1948 until September 1952. Running a city centre pub in Bradford was challenging especially at weekends when the family had the opportunity to take The Airedale Heifer Inn also owned by Heys Brewery's at Sandbeds near Keighley it was too good to turn down. The family ran this pub until 1983.

Following his retirement from rugby league, Harry Hornby invited Whitcombe to sit on the board of directors at Bradford Northern,at various times he served as deputy Chairman & Chairman over his eight years in office between 1950 and 1958. On 10 September 1957 the Rugby League Council unanimously voted to accept Whitcombe as Bradford Northern's representative to The Rugby Football League replacing Harry Hornby after his resignation

Tributes following Whitcombe's death

Whitcombe died of Pneumonia at home on Friday 17 January 1958 aged 44 years. Next day on 18 January Bradford Northern played Doncaster. As a mark of respect to the then Bradford Northern Vice Chairman the players, officials and spectators stood in silence before the game at Bentley Road, Bradford Northern players wore black arm bands.

Cyril Bunney, Bradford Northern Chairman said: " I don't know what to think. This is a terrible blow. He will be a tremendous loss to his family and hundreds of friends at Bradford Northern. No man is irreplaceable but Frank was as near to me as possible in all the help and guidance he has given me personally and to Bradford Northern. His loyalty knew no bounds – this season alone he has travelled thousands of miles at his own expense looking at players for Odsal".

C E 'Ted' Horsfall Rugby Football League Council Chairman said: "What bad luck for his family and Bradford Northern in the help he was giving in re building the club. He was always a great sportsman and could take it and give it with a smile, in addition to being a wonderful forward".

Bill Fallowfield Rugby Football League secretary, said: "What a pity. I liked Frank immensely. He was one the game can ill afford to lose. He has only been a member of the Rugby League Council a short time but his knowledge and genuine love of the game would have been most helpful".

Dai Rees (rugby) Bradford Northern coach, said: "Frank Whitcombe had a great part in putting Bradford Northern on the Rugby League map. The name of Frank Whitcombe and Odsal are synonymous. He was one of the game's greatest personalities. Genial Frank has gone but his name will live on at Odsal".

Arthur Clues Australian Rugby League international "Many's the tussle I've had with Frank. But off the field we were the greatest of pals. I reckon he was one of the best front row forwards for his size ever to play football"

Gideon Shaw, Chairman of the Rugby League selection committee, asked Whitcombe to apply for the team manager's post for the 1958 Ashes tour to Australia. Gideon added: "and who better? He's been out there, he can handle the players, he knows the game thoroughly. Eric England had the typed application ready today". Due to Whitcombe's untimely death, this was a position he never held.

He is buried at Morton Banks Cemetery, not far from the Heifer, with his wife Doris, who died on 18 August 2003.

in 2015 The Rugby Football League Head Office interior meeting rooms included six bespoke framed works celebrating incidental and quirky stories including Billy Boston's début, how Salford acquired the name 'Red Devils' and how Bradord Northern's Frank Whitcombe took over coach driving duties on the way to the 1946–47 Challenge Cup Final.

References

External links
Clayton, Ian & Steele, Michael "When push comes to Shove" 
McLaren, John "The History of Army Rugby" (Aldershot, The Army RFU, 1986)
Jones, Stephen "Dragon in Exile" The Centenary history of London Welsh RFC 
Foster, Simon & Gate, Robert & Lush, Peter. Trevor Foster "The Life of a Rugby League Legend" March 2005 
Thompson, Colin "The Indomitables" The 1946 Rugby League Lions tour to Australia & New Zealand 
Waring, Tony "Eddie Waring – the Great Ones and Other Writings" 
Morris, Graham "Rugby League in Manchester" 
Morris, Graham "Hero: Rugby League's Greatest Award Winners" 
Gate, Robert "Rugby League Lions: 100 Years of Test Matches" 
Morris, Graham "Destination Wembley: The History of the Rugby League Challenge Cup Final" 
Morris, Graham "Grand Final 100 Years of Rugby League Championship Finals" 
Gate, Robert "Bradford Rugby League:Bradford, Northern & Bull's" 
Williams, Graham & Lush, Peter & Farrar, David "The British Rugby League Records Book [Pages 108–114]". London League Publications Ltd. 
Ludlam, H Cedric The Complete History of Bradford Northern RLFC 1963–1969
Gate, Robert "The Struggle for the Ashes" The History of Anglo – Australian Rugby League Test Matches
Writer, Larry 'Bumper': The Life and Times of Frank 'Bumper' Farrell the toughest, roughest street cop that Australia has ever seen 
Whitcombe, Martin & Bridge, Bill. "The Indomitable Frank Whitcombe." St David's Press  
The Whitcombe Family Archive
http://www.bullsfoundation.org/2014/03/flashback-the-grand-final/ Bradford Northern Heritage
https://web.archive.org/web/20140325095900/http://rleague.com/news/Lance-Todd-Trophy-Winners_95342/  Lance Todd trophy winners
http://www.rugbyleagueproject.org/players/frank-whitcombe/summary.html International Career Stats
http://www.britishpathe.com/video/commando-rugby-in-test-draw/query/commando+test Frank Whitcombe scores v Australia
http://www.britishpathe.com/video/rugby-league-international-at-llanelly/query/llanelly+rugby+league Frank Whitcombe début V England
http://www.britishpathe.com/video/rugby-in-france-aka-france-v-wales-rugby/query/rugby Frank Whitcombe second cap V France in Bordeaux 
http://www.britishpathe.com/video/bradford-win-all-yorkshire-duel/query/Whitcombe Frank Whitcombe at Wembley 1949
http://www.walesonline.co.uk/rugbynation/rugby-news/2012/03/20/whitcombe-a-grangetown-production-line-great-91466-30573813/ Frank & George Whitcombe
http://www.telegraph.co.uk/news/obituaries/9681531/Joe-Egan.html Joe Egan tribute
http://www.nma.gov.au/__data/assets/pdf_file/0018/221625/E_no_more_bloody_bundles.pdf Great Britain tour to Australia 1946
http://wigan.rlfans.com/fusion_pages/index.php?page_id=428 Bradford Northern v Wigan Wembley 1947
http://content.yudu.com/Library/A19g2a/SPORTINGWALESISSUESE/resources/48.htm Indomitables Tour
http://www.cardiffrfc.com/Teams/Player?personid=152026 Cardiff RFC
http://nla.gov.au/nla.news-article17978631 Sydney Morning Herald 13 May 1946 Great Britain team profiles
http://trove.nla.gov.au/newspaper/article/98381544?searchTerm=17%201%2F2%20stone%20hustler&searchLimits= 171/2 Stone Hustler
http://nla.gov.au/nla.news-article98381668?searchTerm=frank%20whitcombe%20rugby&searchLimits=l-textSearchScope=*ignore*%7C*ignore*|||l-word=*ignore*%7C*ignore* Great Britain v New South Wales
http://nla.gov.au/nla.news-article140613606?searchTerm=frank%20whitcombe%20rugby&searchLimits=l-textSearchScope=*ignore*%7C*ignore*|||l-word=*ignore*%7C*ignore* Great Britain v Queensland
http://nla.gov.au/nla.news-article114566396?searchTerm=frank%20whitcombe%20rugby&searchLimits=l-textSearchScope=*ignore*%7C*ignore*|||l-word=*ignore*%7C*ignore* Training the Sydney Cricket ground
http://nla.gov.au/nla.news-article50254432?searchTerm=frank%20whitcombe%20rugby&searchLimits=l-textSearchScope=*ignore*%7C*ignore*|||l-word=*ignore*%7C*ignore* Travelling in Australia - "Beer, Pigs and Footballers"
http://nla.gov.au/nla.news-article62877733?searchTerm=frank%20whitcombe%20rugby&searchLimits=l-textSearchScope=*ignore*%7C*ignore*|||l-word=*ignore*%7C*ignore* Whitcombe to play for St George?
http://nla.gov.au/nla.news-article50248453?searchTerm=frank%20whitcombe%20rugby&searchLimits=l-textSearchScope=*ignore*%7C*ignore*|||l-word=*ignore*%7C*ignore* War Service
http://nla.gov.au/nla.news-article17987863?searchTerm=frank%20whitcombe%20try&searchLimits=l-textSearchScope=*ignore*%7C*ignore*|||l-word=*ignore*%7C*ignore* Australia 8 8 Great Britain
http://www.therugbypaper.co.uk/features/columnists/peter-jackson/15972/peter-jackson-big-mans-dynasty-is-thriving-at-tigers/ Frank Whitcombe's Dynasty
http://www.keighleynews.co.uk/sport/10639730.Whitcombes_are_back_at_Wembley/ Frank Whitcombe's great grandchildren return to Wembley
http://www.walesonline.co.uk/news/wales-news/time-great-sportand-now-book-11696307 Wales Online reviews 'The Indomitable Frank Whitcombe'
http://www.cardiffrfc.com/Teams/Player?personid=152026 Frank Whitcombe Cardiff RFC

Physical power of Whitcombe swats Halifax aside in 1949 final
West Town Boys and Frank Whitcombe at rugbyleagueoralhistory.co.uk
Frank-Whitcombe, Jr. Obituary at yorkshirepost.co.uk
(archived by web.archive.org) Bradford win Yorkshire Cup
Photograph 'A trio of British Players' at rlhp.co.uk
Photograph 'Whitcombe at work' at rlhp.co.uk
Photograph 'The 1947 Team' at rlhp.co.uk
Photograph '1947 Welsh team' at rlhp.co.uk
Photograph 'Mine host Frank Whitcombe admires the cups' at rlhp.co.uk
Photograph 'Frank Whitcombe, Lance Todd Trophy winner 1948' at rlhp.co.uk
Photograph 'Benefits presented' at rlhp.co.uk
Photograph 'Bradford Northern v Halifax 1942' at rlhp.co.uk
Photograph 'Mighty Frank' at rlhp.co.uk
Photograph 'Benefits presented' at rlhp.co.uk
Photograph '1948 Challenge Cup Final' at rlhp.co.uk
Photograph 'Farewell to a great player' at rlhp.co.uk
Photograph 'Here come the victors' at rlhp.co.uk
Photograph 'Touring quartet' at rlhp.co.uk
Photograph 'Championship winning team 1945' at rlhp.co.uk
Photograph 'Frank Whitcombe' at rlhp.co.uk
Photograph 'Eric Batten Kicks' at rlhp.co.uk
Photograph 'Challenge cup winning side.' at rlhp.co.uk
Photograph 'Frank Whitcombe' at rlhp.co.uk
Photograph 'Northern at Fartown' at rlhp.co.uk

1913 births
1958 deaths
Aldershot Services rugby union players
Army rugby union players
Bradford Bulls players
British Home Guard soldiers
British publicans
British rugby league administrators
Broughton Rangers players
Cardiff RFC players
Footballers who switched code
Great Britain national rugby league team players
Lance Todd Trophy winners
London Welsh RFC players
People from Grangetown, Cardiff
Royal Engineers soldiers
Rugby league players from Cardiff
Rugby league props
Rugby League XIII players
Rugby union players from Cardiff
Rugby union props
Wales national rugby league team players
Welsh rugby league players
Welsh rugby union players
Yorkshire rugby league team players